The radio transmitter system of Caltanissetta or Antenna RAI of Caltanissetta is a plant, now idle, for broadcast on long wave, medium and short; tipe guyed mast. The transmitter is insulated against ground.

Its main element is an omnidirectional antenna 286 meters high, which holds the record for the tallest structure in Italy; it stands on a hill 689 meters above sea level; The top antenna is placed at 975 meters above sea level.

See also 
 List of tallest structures in Italy
 List of tallest buildings in Italy

References

Towers completed in 1951
Towers in Italy